The Phat Pack is the third studio album by the jazz ensemble Gordon Goodwin's Big Phat Band. Goodwin received a Grammy Award nomination for Best Instrumental Arrangement for the song "Attack of the Killer Tomatoes".

The title is a parody of the Rat Pack, a group of friends and performers during the 1960s which included Frank Sinatra and Sammy Davis Jr. Goodwin arranged cover versions of two songs that were associated with the Rat Pack, "Too Close for Comfort" and "It Was a Very Good Year", and a hit from the 1970s, "Play That Funky Music".

Soloists include Wayne Bergeron, Eddie Daniels, Eric Marienthal, Andy Martin, David Sanborn, Bob Summers, and the vocal group Take 6.

Track listing 

Source: AllMusic

Personnel

 Gordon Goodwin – tenor saxophone, piano, arranger
 Dan Savant – trumpet
 Wayne Bergeron – trumpet
 Daniel Fornero – trumpet
 Alex Iles – trombone
 Andy Martin – trombone
 Charlie Morillas – trombone
 Craig Gosnell – trombone
 Craig Ware – trombone
 Eric Marienthal – flute, alto saxophone, soprano saxophone
 Sal Lozano – flute, alto saxophone, piccolo
 David Sanborn – saxophone
 Eddie Daniels – clarinet
 Jeff Driskill – clarinet, tenor saxophone
 Brian Scanlon – clarinet, tenor saxophone
 Jay Mason – bass clarinet, baritone saxophone
 Grant Geissman – guitar
 Carl Verheyen – guitar
 Ray Brinker – drums
 Bernie Dresel – drums
 Rick Shaw - Acoustic bass, electric bass
 Luis Conte – percussion
 Brad Dutz – percussion
 Dianne Reeves – vocals
 Take 6 – vocals

Production

 Gordon Goodwin – producer
 Evan Johnson – producer
 Dan Savant – producer
 David K. Tedds – producer
 John Trickett – executive producer
 Bernie Grundman – mastering
 Tommy Vicari – engineer, mixing

References

2006 albums
Gordon Goodwin's Big Phat Band albums
Big band albums